The AEG B.III was a German two-seat biplane reconnaissance aircraft produced in very small numbers from 1915. It was a further refinement of the B.I and B.II, with a fresh tailplane assembly, but was still only just adequate in performance and did not attract much interest. The B.III was put into reconnaissance and training roles in 1915, but was soon replaced by armed aircraft in the German military.

Specifications (AEG B.III)

See also
 Aerial reconnaissance
 Surveillance aircraft

References

External links
AEG B.III at the Virtual Aviation Museum

Single-engined tractor aircraft
Biplanes
1910s German military reconnaissance aircraft
B.III
Aircraft first flown in 1915